Crustulina sticta is a species of cobweb spider in the family Theridiidae. It is found in North America, Europe, Turkey, Caucasus, a range from Russia (European to Sibiria), Kazakhstan, China, Korea, and Japan.

References

Further reading

External links

 

Theridiidae
Articles created by Qbugbot
Spiders described in 1861